Verone Chambers (born December 16, 1988) is a Jamaican sprinter. She ran for Oklahoma Baptist University, graduating in 2012 after winning 18 NAIA championship titles, a record high for OBU women. Chambers was part of Jamaica's silver-medal-winning 4x400 m relay team at the 2014 IAAF World Indoor Championships, although she only ran in the heats. At the 2015 Pan American Games, she again ran in the 4x400 m relay for Jamaica, and won a silver medal along with Anastasia Le-Roy, Chrisann Gordon, and Bobby-Gaye Wilkins. She ran in the 4x400 m relay at the 2017 IAAF World Relays, winning third place. Chambers is from in Clarendon, Jamaica.

References 

Living people
1988 births
Jamaican female sprinters
Pan American Games silver medalists for Jamaica
Pan American Games medalists in athletics (track and field)
Athletes (track and field) at the 2015 Pan American Games
Medalists at the 2015 Pan American Games
People from Clarendon Parish, Jamaica
21st-century Jamaican women